Jennewein is a surname. Notable people with the surname include:

C. Paul Jennewein (1890–1978), German-born American sculptor
Jim Jennewein, screenwriter and writer
Jim Jennewein (architect), American architect
Josef Jennewein (1919–1943), German alpine skier and world champion
Thomas Jennewein, Austrian physicist

See also 

Jenewein